Fifth Armored may refer to:

 5th Armored Division (United States), active from 1941 to 1945 and from 1950 to 1956
 5th Armored Division (France), active from 1943 to 1992
 5th Armored Brigade (United States), based at Fort Bliss, Texas

See also
 5th Brigade